A lynx is a type of wild cat.

Lynx may also refer to:

Astronomy
 Lynx (constellation)
 Lynx (Chinese astronomy)
 Lynx X-ray Observatory, a NASA-funded mission concept for a next-generation X-ray space observatory

Places

Canada
 Lynx, Ontario, an unincorporated place and railway point
 Lynx Mountain, in the Canadian Rockies
 Lynx Lake (Northwest Territories)
 Lynx Formation, a stratigraphical unit in western Canada

United States
 Lynx, Ohio, a census-designated place
 Lynx Lake (Arizona), a reservoir

Antarctica
 Lynx Rocks, South Shetland Islands, Antarctica

Transport

Vehicles
 Leyland Lynx, a model of single-decker bus produced by British Leyland in the 1980s and 1990s
 Mercury Lynx, a model of car
 Mitsubishi Lynx, a 1993 Mitsubishi Motors concept car
 GWR no. 2109 Lynx, a South Devon Railway Eagle class steam locomotive
 Lynx (tall ship), an interpretation of the 1812 privateer schooner, launched in 2001
 Lynx (snowmobile), a brand of snowmobiles
 XCOR Lynx, a proposed rocket-powered spaceplane that was under development
 AA-1C Lynx, part of the Grumman American AA-1 series of light aircraft

Companies and services
 Lynx (bus company), a bus company based in King's Lynn, Norfolk
 Lynx (Orlando), a bus system operated by the Central Florida Regional Transportation Authority
 Lynx Air, a Canadian low cost carrier airline
 Lynx Air International, an American airline
 Lynx Aviation, an American regional airline from 2006 to 2011
 Lynx Rapid Transit Services, the public transit system in Charlotte, North Carolina
 Lynx Express, a former long-distance passenger train and fast ferry service in the South Island of New Zealand

Military
 , nine British Royal Navy ships
 Lynx, an American schooner captured by the Royal Navy in 1813 and renamed 
 , several United States Navy ships
 , a United States Navy patrol vessel in commission from 1917 to 1919
 French destroyer Lynx, scuttled in 1942 to avoid capture by the Germans
 French corvette Lynx (1804)
 Finnish 5th Division (Continuation War) or Lynx Division, a unit of the Finnish Army
 Lynx reconnaissance vehicle, used by the armed forces of Canada and the Netherlands
 Panhard AML-90 Lynx, a variant of the lightweight French AML-90 armoured car
 Pansarbil m/39 Lynx, a Swedish armoured car used by the Swedish and Danish armies
 Lynx Scout Car, a Canadian–built version of the World War II Daimler Dingo
 Lynx, a version of the ERC 90 Sagaie, a French six wheeled fire-support and reconnaissance vehicle
 Lynx (Rheinmetall armoured fighting vehicle), a family of tracked armored vehicles developed by Rheinmetall Landsysteme
 Lynx, the name of military versions of the Cessna Skymaster, flown by the Rhodesian Air Force
 Westland Lynx, a British military helicopter manufactured by AgustaWestland
 LYNX (multiple rocket launcher), a multiple rocket launcher manufactured by Israel Military Industries

Businesses and brands
 Lynx Express (parcels) (or simply Lynx), a UK parcel carrier, now owned by UPS
 Lynx Software Technologies, an American software company
 Lynx Rifles, a Finnish manufacturer of handmade straight pull rifles
 Yashica Lynx, a family of rangefinder cameras from the 1960s
 Lynx (grooming product), a brand of deodorant known as Axe in some markets
 Lynx, a brand of footwear owned by Colorado Group Limited

Computing
 Lynx (protocol), a protocol for efficient transfer of files over modems
 Lynx (web browser), a text-based web browser commonly used on Unix workstations
 Lynx (programming language), a programming language for large distributed networks
 Lynx Point, an Intel chipset
 LynxOS, an operating system
 Camputers Lynx, a British computer
 Lynx family, a family of HP AlphaServers

Gaming
 Lynx (video game console), a handheld gaming console by Atari
 Lynx (Chrono Cross), a major character in the video game Chrono Cross

People
 Lynx Vaughan Gaede (born 1992), half of the American white nationalist folk teen duo Prussian Blue
 The Lynx gang, a violent criminal gang based in Birmingham, United Kingdom
 The Lynxes, a popular name for members of the Accademia dei Lincei, the first scientific society

Sports
 Minnesota Lynx, a WNBA basketball team
 Toronto Lynx, a USL First Division soccer team
 Ottawa Lynx, a former AAA minor league baseball team
 Lynx du Collège Édouard-Montpetit women's ice hockey, a Quebec, Canada college hockey team
 Augusta Lynx, a minor league professional ice hockey team in Augusta, Georgia
 Saint-Jean Lynx, a defunct Quebec Major Junior Hockey League team
 Adirondack Lynx, an American women's soccer team
 Tampere Lynx (Tampereen Ilves), a Finnish soccer team
 Toronto Lady Lynx, a Canadian women's soccer team
 Perth Lynx, an Australian professional women's basketball team
 The Lynx, another name for the Slovenia men's national ice hockey team
 Lynx, name of the athletic teams and mascot of Lesley University, a private university in Massachusetts
 The Lynx, mascot for Rhodes College, a private college in Memphis, Tennessee
 Lynx, mascot of Lindenwood University – Belleville, Illinois

Other uses
 Armstrong Siddeley Lynx, an early aircraft engine
 Lynx (mythology), in various mythologies
 Lynx (comics), three fictional characters in the DC Comics universe
 Lynx (magazine), a Japanese literary magazine published by Gentosha Comics every other month

See also
 Luchs (disambiguation) - German term for lynx
 Linx (disambiguation)
 Link (disambiguation)
 Lince (disambiguation)
 Lync, an American band